The 53rd Filmfare Awards South ceremony honouring the winners and nominees of the best of South Indian cinema in films released 2005, is an event that was held at the Jawaharlal Nehru Indoor Stadium, Chennai on 9 September 2006.

Main awards
Winners are listed first, highlighted in boldface.

Kannada cinema

Malayalam cinema

Tamil cinema

Telugu cinema

Technical Awards

Special awards

References

General
 53rd FAIR ONE FILMFARE SOUTH AWARDS

External links
 
 

Filmfare Awards South
2006 Indian film awards